A fatayer is a meat pie that can alternatively be stuffed with spinach, or cheese such as Feta or Akkawi. It is part of Levantine cuisine and is eaten in Iraq, Syria, Egypt, Lebanon, Kuwait, Saudi Arabia, Yemen, Palestine, Jordan and Israel. In Argentina, fatayer are also popular as a variety of empanada, called empanada árabe.

See also 

Curry puff
Sfiha
Empanada
Samosa
Lahmacun
Uchpuchmak
Börek
Chebureki
Bougatsa
Pogača
Banitsa
Khachapuri
Knish
Cantiq
Pierogi
Pirozhki
Spanakopita
Hamantash

References 

Arab cuisine
Cypriot cuisine
Egyptian cuisine
Iraqi cuisine
Palestinian cuisine
Jordanian cuisine
Lebanese cuisine
Levantine cuisine
Savoury pies
Syrian cuisine
Tatar cuisine
Tapas